Aechmea tillandsioides  is a bromeliad widespread across southern Mexico, Central America, and northern South America (Colombia, Venezuela, the Guianas, Ecuador, northern Brazil).  It is widely cultivated in other regions as an ornamental plant. This plant is cited in Flora Brasiliensis by Carl Friedrich Philipp von Martius.

Cultivars
 Aechmea 'Tillantini'

References

External links
  Flora Brasiliensis Aechmea tillandsioides

tillandsioides
Flora of South America
Flora of Central America
Flora of Mexico
Plants described in 1830
Taxa named by Carl Friedrich Philipp von Martius
Taxa named by Julius Hermann Schultes
Taxa named by Josef August Schultes
Taxa named by John Gilbert Baker